Don Mason may refer to:

 Don Mason (baseball) (1944–2018), American baseball player
 Don Mason (actor) (1929–1980), Canadian actor
 Don Mason (immunologist), British immunologist
 Don Barry Mason (1950–2006), founder of the Psychedelic Shamanistic Institute
 Donald Mason (basketball), in 1982–83 Philadelphia 76ers season